East Union is an unincorporated community in Carver County, Minnesota, United States.

The community lies on the boundary line between Dahlgren Township and San Francisco Township. The center of East Union is generally considered at the junction of Carver County Roads 40, 43, and 50. Nearby places include Chaska, Carver, and Cologne. Bevens Creek flows through the community.

History
The area was originally settled by Swedish immigrants in 1854, who traveled up the nearby Minnesota River via flatboat. They established King Oscar's Settlement, which later divided into the parishes of East Union and West Union. East Union Lutheran Church and its parish hall are listed on the National Register of Historic Places as King Oscar's Settlement. Gustavus Adolphus College was founded in East Union in 1862; the college is now in St. Peter, Minnesota.

Notable person
Andrew Holt, Minnesota Supreme Court justice, was born in East Union.

References

Unincorporated communities in Carver County, Minnesota
Unincorporated communities in Minnesota
Swedish-American culture in Minnesota